REGI may refer to:

 Committee on Regional Development, committee within the European Parliament
 Raptor Education Group Inc., wildlife rehabilitation centre in Wisconsin, USA